Chiril Gaburici (born 23 November 1976) is a Moldovan businessman and former Prime Minister of Moldova.

Biography
Chiril Gaburici was born on 23 November 1976, in Logănești,  Kotovsk raion of the then Soviet Republic of Moldova (RSSM). He subsequently graduated from Slavonian University as an economist. Between 2001–2003, Chiril was the regional sales representative of Moldcell (mobile network operator). He was in charge of the sales network in the regions. After, in 2004 he took the lead of Regional Sales Department of Moldcell. Between 2004 and 2008, he was the Sales Director of the company. Since 2008, Chiril has been the CEO of Moldcell as a decision of the board, being the only local CEO in the TeliaSonera grup. In 2012, Chiril was offered to move in Azerbaijan to the CEO position of Azercell (part of TeliaSonera). In 2015, he left the company. On 14 February 2015, with a decree of the former Moldovan President Nicolae Timofti, Chiril Gaburici was named candidate for the position of Prime Minister of the Government of Moldova. On the 18 February, with the majority votes in the parliament, he was elected for this position.

Early career 

He was the first Moldovan manager of the company Moldcell. In 2012, he went to Azercell, Azerbaijan. The President invited him to form a government on 14 February 2015. He had 15 days to obtain parliamentary approval of his cabinet. On 18 February 2015, Parliament approved his cabinet. He was sworn in the same day. He resigned on 12 June 2015 after his open letter were he asked General prosecutor and National Banks Governor to dismiss. The politicians were trying to create some stories about Chiril Gaburici school diploma. On 22 June he was succeeded by Natalia Gherman.

Personal life
Chiril Gaburici is married to Irina and together they have tree children. He speaks Romanian, Russian, English, and French. He is passionate about guitar and car sports. Chiril Gaburici is also passionate about Green Energy and he is fond in ECO production! He participated in professional racing and rallies. He is the president of the national autosport club and EcoFarm.

Controversies
At the end of February 2015, after receiving an anonymous message with some clues, and motivated by the fact that in the official CV of Chiril Gaburici there are no academic years but only the name of the institutions, journalists from Ziarul de Gardă did an investigation about his studies. Thus, they learned that, after graduating from gymnasium, Chiril Gaburici studied at the Republican College of Microelectronics and Computer Engineering (CRMTC) in Chisinau, although he had not indicated this in his official CV. According to the vice director of the respective institution, Gaburici studied at the CRMTC during 1992-1995 and was a very good student, but he had not attended the baccalaureate session and was not awarded the BAC diploma.
According to the same investigation, in 2009-2011, being already director at Moldcell, at the age of 33, Gaburici has obtained his master's degree at the Free International University of Moldova (ULIM). He subsequently completed doctoral studies at the University of the Academy of Sciences of Moldova (UASM), based on a contract. He was enrolled at UASM in 2011 at non-frequency studies, followed a 4-year study, and 2015 was his final year of studies. In an official response of the Government of the Republic of Moldova to the request for clarification of the situation, it is said (in addition to the data above) that Gaburici was admitted to ASEM in 1995, and in 1998 he transferred to the Slavonic University.

See also 

 Political Alliance for a European Moldova – governing coalition

References 

1976 births
Liberal Democratic Party of Moldova politicians
Living people
People from Hîncești District
Prime Ministers of Moldova